Michael Barker is a New Zealand percussion musician best known for performing with The John Butler Trio and Split Enz. In more recent years Barker formed Swamp Thing.

Musical career

Barker wrote, recorded, mixed and released his first solo album, Wonderland in November 2006.

Since 2010, he and Grant Haua are Swamp Thing.

Personal life
In 2007, Michael Barker made headlines as he unsuccessfully tried to save the life of a drowning man in Townsville, Queensland.

References

External links
 Barker bio on Split Enz fan site

Living people
New Zealand drummers
Male drummers
People from Rotorua
Year of birth missing (living people)